Cape Goldschmidt is a low ice-covered cape forming the eastern tip of Nicholson Peninsula, at the west side of the Ross Ice Shelf, Antarctica. It was named by the New Zealand Geological Survey Antarctic Expedition (NZGSAE) (1960–61) for Donald R. Goldschmidt, a member of the NZGSAE parties of 1959–60 and 1960–61 which mapped this area.

References

Headlands of the Ross Dependency
Shackleton Coast